Cyrtostylis oblonga, commonly known as the winter orchid or gnat orchid, is a species of orchid endemic to New Zealand. It has a single rounded leaf and a flowering stem with up to four pink or pinkish green flowers with a flat, oblong labellum.

Description
The dorsal sepal is erect, linear to narrow lance-shaped and the lateral sepals are narrow linear and somewhat smaller than the dorsal sepal. The petals are similar in size and shape to the lateral sepals. The column is shorter than the labellum and has two wings widening towards the tip. Flowering occurs from July to November.

Taxonomy and naming
Cyrtostylis oblonga was first formally described in 1853 by Joseph Dalton Hooker in Flora Novae-Zelandiae. The specific epithet (oblonga) is a Latin word meaning "longer than broad".

Distribution and habitat
The winter orchid grows in scrub, forest and open areas on the northern part of the North Island and on Three Kings Islands in New Zealand.

References

External links
 

oblonga
Endemic orchids of New Zealand
Orchids of New Zealand
Plants described in 1853
Taxa named by Joseph Dalton Hooker